The Soviet Union (predecessor of the Russian Federation) and Pakistan first established the diplomatic and bilateral relations on 1 May 1948.

Throughout the Cold War, the Soviet Union's relations with Pakistan saw ups and downs. From 1948 to 1958, the Soviet Union enjoyed relatively healthy and strong relations with Pakistan when it was under civilian control, but they went ultimately cold soon after the US-backed 1958 military coup d'état, although attempts to warm relations were made after the 1965 Indo-Pakistan war. However, in the 1980s, relations began to deteriorate again, and during the Soviet–Afghan War, Pakistan played a key role against the Soviet Union by supplying FIM-92 Stinger missiles to the Mujahideen backed by the aid of the United States. The Stinger Missiles played a key role by accurately shooting down Soviet helicopters, killing thousands of Soviet Air Force troops. Pakistan is credited for playing a key role for allying and supporting the West during this time period of the Cold War. In response to ongoing Soviet support to communist Afghanistan regarding the Durand Line issue during the late 1970s and 1980s, Pakistan began to support Mujahideen rebels attempting to overthrow the Soviet-backed communist regime and was later aided by the United States, United Kingdom, China and Saudi Arabia. This led to the Soviet occupation of Afghanistan. Due to the condemnation of Soviet actions in Afghanistan, Pakistan was one of the 80 total countries that boycotted the 1980 Summer Olympics scheduled in Moscow.

In recent years ties between Russia and Pakistan have warmed as a countermeasure to warming ties between India and the United States. The two countries carried out their first-ever joint military drills in 2016. Pakistan and Russia signed an agreement for the Pakistan Stream Gas pipeline from Karachi to Kasur, and reached a price accord by December 2016. Pakistan has also granted Russia access to a warm water port in the Arabian sea (Gwadar Port).

On May 1, 2018, Pakistan celebrated the 70th anniversary of diplomatic relations with Russia.

Historical relations

Soviet relations with Pakistan (then part of the British Raj) dated back to 1922 after the Bolshevik Revolution. From 1922 to 1927, people who entered from the Soviet Union into the territory (now Pakistan) held by the British Empire, attempted to start a communist revolution against the British Indian Empire. The series of coups known as Peshawar Conspiracy Cases; the British Empire was terrified after the intelligence on attempted communist revolution in India were revealed to authorities. From 1947 to 1950 and 1965–1969, the trade, educational, and cultural exchanges between two countries increased. But the Soviet efforts were undermined by the Soviet Union by itself when Soviet criticism of Pakistan's position in the 1971 war with India weakened bilateral relations, and many people of Pakistan believed that the August 1971 Indo-Soviet Treaty of Friendship, Peace and Cooperation encouraged India invasion of East Pakistan. Subsequent Soviet arms sales to India, amounting to billions of dollars on concessional terms, reinforced this argument. The USSR also kept vetoing every resolution regarding the East Pakistan situation that Pakistan brought to the United Nations.

Relations with Soviet Union: 1947–1991

Democratic governments (1947–1958)

The Soviet Union–Pakistan relations (Russian: Союз Советских Социалистических Республик -Пакистан) dated back to 1948 when Moscow directed a farewell message to then-Prime Minister Liaquat Ali Khan. Pakistan gained independence during the penultimate times of cold war, and the Russian military involvement in Afghanistan had a long history, going back to Tsarist times in the so-called "Great Game" between Russia and Great Britain.

According to the studies conducted by the Institute of Strategic Studies (ISS), the Soviet Union did not welcomed the partition of Bengal and Punjab, fluctuating from cool to antagonistic and hostile relations. Moscow gave vehement criticism to United Kingdom for partitioning the region, regarded as the "Divide and rule strategy of foreign policy of Great Britain, and had earlier labeled the Muslim League as a tool of the British, from its very inception. Joseph Stalin and officials at Moscow did not send any congratulatory message to Governor-General Jinnah—founder of Pakistan. Rather the Soviet Union extended relations after the death of Jinnah, after sending the invitation to Prime Minister Liaquat Ali Khan on April 1948. During the 1947 war, Soviet Union remained neutral non-committal attitude, while the Western countries moved the Kashmir dispute to United Nations Security Council, to settle the dispute. The Status quo was more acceptable to India, not by Pakistan, initially influence Moscow to vote in favor of India in 1947. During 1947–1953, Pakistan was an early member of Non-Aligned Movement (NAM) facing the challenging issues involving the economic default, internal unrest, challenges in foreign policy, constitutional crises, and the problems at the Constituent Assembly after the death of Jinnah. Initially, Pakistan waited to see if any nation was willing to help the country to re-build its massive military and economical aid, and leading bureaucrat at this time, Sir Firoz Ali Khan had revealed that:

In April 1948, at the UN Economic and Social Commission for Asia and Far East, Pakistan's foreign officers of Pakistan announced that "she (Pakistan) would accept aid from any source", but the Soviets did not respond to that request. In 1948, Prime Minister Ali Khan made several attempts to the Soviet Union to establish relations, but the Soviets remained quiet. In April 1948, Foreign minister Sir Zafarullah Khan held talks with Deputy Foreign minister Andrei Gromyko, subjecting the diplomatic relation. During this time, Pakistan saw relations with the Soviet Union from the prism of relations with India just as these days it sees ties with the United States.

However, the policy was changed after Soviet Union witnessed two events particularly forcing them to respond to Pakistan when India decided to remain within the Commonwealth Nations, it was a clear sign that India was leaning towards the Western countries under the U.S. auspices. The second event was the Indian premier Jawaharlal Nehru's announcement to pay the state visit to the United States on May 7, 1949. To a reaction, Soviet Union extended an invitation to Prime Minister, Liaquat Ali Khan, in 1949 to visit Moscow, becoming the first Prime Minister from the Commonwealth of Nations to visit the communist country, but Soviet Union herself did not materialized the dates or the plans. Instead, Prime Minister Ali Khan went onto paid a state visit to United States, taking the largest diplomatic and military convey with him, a clear rebuff to Soviet Union. According to studies completed by Pakistan Institute of International Affairs (PIIA), the real motives, goals and objectives, were to an economic and technical assistance. "There are important divergences of outlook between Pakistan, with its Islamic background, and the Soviet Union with its background of Marxism which is atheistic. ... Pakistan had noticed the subservience which was forced upon the allies of the Soviet Union. ... Furthermore, there was the question whether Russia could supply the aid, both material and technical, which Pakistan so urgently needed..." PIIA noted.

The relations suffered setback when members of Communist Party led by communist Faiz Ahmad Faiz, sponsored by Major-General Akbar Khan, hatched a coup d'état against Prime Minister Liaquat Ali Khan in 1950 (See Rawalpindi conspiracy case). Soon, three years after, Prime Minister Liaqat Ali Khan assassinated while campaigning for his electoral term. During 1954–58, the relations were strained and hostility against each other as time passes. In 1954, Pakistan became a member of SEATO and CENTO in 1955, which Soviet Union did not welcome, overtly opting the Pro-Indian policy and regarding the Kashmir as part of India. As a result of 1954–55 elections, Prime Minister Huseyn Suhrawardy, a left-wing Prime Minister, made deliberate attempts to improve relations. On March–April 1954, a delegation of the Soviet cultural troupe toured Pakistan and a festival of the Soviet films was held in Karachi. To reciprocate this, the Pakistan Government also sent a delegation to study the Soviet industrial and agricultural development In 1956, Soviet premier Nikolai Bulganin offered technical and scientific assistance to Prime Minister Suhrawardy for the peaceful uses of nuclear energy, offering Soviet contribution after Suhrawardy submitted the plan to established the nuclear power against India. In 1958, Soviet Union agreed to give Pakistan aid in agriculture, economic, science, control of pest, flood control, desalination, soil erosion and technical assistance to Pakistan. In 1958, Pakistan and Soviet Union finally established an oil consortium, Pakistan Oilfields, and expressing interests in establishing the country's first steel mills.

Military dictatorships (1958–1971)
In July 1957, Prime Minister Suhrawardy approved the leasing of the secret ISI installation, Peshawar Air Station, to CIA. After commencing the military coup d'état against President Iskander Mirza, Army Commander Ayub Khan visited the United States, further enhancing relations with the U.S. while at same time, trying establishing link with Soviet Union through Zulfikar Ali Bhutto.

The U-2 incident worsened relations between the Soviet Union and Pakistan. General Khalid Mahmud Arif, former chief of army staff, wrote of the incident that, "Pakistan felt deceived because the U.S. had kept her in the dark about such clandestine spy operations launched from Pakistan’s territory".

The Soviet Union paid back its revenge on Indo-Pakistani war of 1965, emerged as the biggest supplier of military hardware to India. India on other hand, distanced from the Western countries, developed close relations with the Soviet Union. Soviet Union and India used the diplomacy, convincing the U.S. and Western powers to keep a ban on Pakistan's military and hardware. After the 1965 war, the arms race between India and Pakistan became even more asymmetric and India was outdistancing Pakistan by far. However, in 1968, Soviet Union and Pakistan made an arms deal.

Relations with West and East Pakistan

The Soviet Union had far better relations with East Pakistan (Now Bangladesh), and had strong ties with Communist Party after successfully staging the protest of Bengali Language Movement to give national recognition to the language as compare to Urdu in 1956 constitution. The Communist Party had ensure the complete elimination of Pakistan Muslim League once and for all, leading the collapse of central government of Pakistan Muslim League in the federal government. The tendency of democracy and the Anti-American sentiment was greater in East-Pakistan, which highly benefited the Soviet Union in 1971. When the mutual defence treaty, following the arrival of military advsers from the MAAG group, which was announced in February 1954, there was a great outcry in East-Pakistan. Many demonstrations, led by communist party were held and the 162 newly elected members of East-Pakistan Parliament signed a statement, which denounced Pakistan's government for signing a military pact with United States.

In West-Pakistan, the Soviet relations had improved after the formation of leading democratic socialist Pakistan Peoples Party. The tendency of socialism was greater in West Pakistan, in contrast to East Pakistan were the tendency of communism was at its height. After the 1965 war, Soviet relations with socialist mass, Awami National Party, Pakistan People's Party, and the Pakistan Socialist Party, impulsively improved. In 1972, the West-Pakistan Parliament passed the resolution which called for establishing ties with Soviet Union. During the 1980s when the purged took place under the Zia regime, the socialist members escaped to the Soviet Union through Afghanistan, seeking the political asylum there.

Role in Indo-Pakistani war of 1971
The Soviet Union played a decisive role in the 1971 Winter war, first signing the Indo-Soviet Treaty of Friendship and Cooperation. The Soviet Union sympathized with the Bangladeshis, and supported the Indian Army and Mukti Bahini during the war, recognizing that the independence of Bangladesh would weaken the position of its rivals—the United States, Saudi Arabia, and China.

On 6 December and 13 December 1971, the Soviet Navy dispatched two groups of cruisers and destroyers and a nuclear submarine armed with nuclear missiles from Vladivostok; they trailed U.S. Task Force 74 into the Indian Ocean from 18 December 1971 until 7 January 1972. The Soviets also had a nuclear submarine to help ward off the threat posed to India by USS Enterprise task force in the Indian Ocean. The Soviet Navy's presence was threatening for Pakistan, with the Soviet nuclear submarines' K-320 and Charlie, movements were picked up by the Pakistan Navy's submarines. The Pakistan Navy's submarines Ghazi, Hangor, and Mangor had sent solid evidence of Soviet Navy's covert involvement helping the Indian Navy, and Soviet Navy's own secret operations against the Pakistan Navy.  Pakistan Navy avoided aggressive contacts with the Soviet Navy due to possible nuclear retaliation by Soviet nuclear submarines in Karachi. In 2012, at an official press release in the Russian Consulate-General Karachi, the Russian ambassador remarked that the former Soviet stance against Pakistan in 1971 did "somewhat embarrassed our relations".

Democratic government (1971–1977)

The democratic socialist alliance led by then-Prime Minister Zulfikar Ali Bhutto made an effort to improve relations with the Soviet Union, and for the first time in Pakistani history, the Soviet Union's ties with Pakistan began to warm and relations were quickly improved. Reviving his foreign policy, Bhutto relieved Pakistan from SEATO and CENTO, breaking off the relations with the United States under President Jimmy Carter. In 1974, Bhutto paid a tiring and lengthy state visit to Soviet Union, becoming the first Prime Minister since the independence of Pakistan in 1947. Bhutto and his delegation was met with great jubilation, a warm-heated celebration took place after Bhutto was received by Alexei Kosygin in Moscow. The honorary guard of honor was bestowed by the Soviet Armed Forces, and strong interaction was made during Bhutto's democratic era. Bhutto also met with Leonid Brezhnev where Pakistan reached agreements with Soviet Union on mutual trust, cooperation, technical assistance, and friendship.

While there, Bhutto succeeded to convince the Soviet Union to establish the integrated steel mills, which prompted the Soviet Union to provide funds for the billion dollar project. Prime Minister Bhutto made a deliberate attempt to warm relations with Russia as he was trying to improve relations with the Communist bloc. Bhutto sought to develop and alleviate the Soviet-Pak Relations, as the Soviet Union established Pakistan Steel Mills in 1972. The foundation stone for this gigantic project was laid on 30 December 1973 by the then Prime Minister Mr. Zulfiqar Ali Bhutto. Facing inexperience for the erection work of the integrated steel mill, Bhutto requested Soviet Union to send its experts. Soviet Union sends dozens of advisors and experts, under Russian scientist Mikhail Koltokof, who supervised the construction of this integrated Steel Mills, with a number of industrial and consortium companies financing this mega-project.

From 1973 to 1979, Soviet Union and Pakistan enjoyed a strong relationship with each other which also benefited the Soviet Union. This interaction was short lived after popular unrest began to take place after the 1977 elections. With United States support, the CIA-sponsored operation codenamed Fair Play removed Bhutto from power in 1977. The Soviet relations with Pakistan deteriorated on April 4, 1979, when Bhutto was executed by the Supreme Court of Pakistan. Earlier, Leonid Brezhnev, Alexei Kosygin, and other members of the Politburo had sent repeated calls for clemency to CMLA General Muhammad Zia-ul-Haq who forcefully rejected the Soviet requests. Breznev maintained the issue of Bhutto was Pakistan's internal matter but did not wish to see him executed. When Bhutto was hanged, Brezhnev condemned the act out of "purely humane motives".

Military dictatorship (1977–1988)

Shortly after the Soviet intervention in Afghanistan, military ruler General Muhammad Zia-ul-Haq called for a meeting of senior military members and technocrats of his military government. At this meeting, General Zia-ul-Haq asked the Chief of Army Staff General Khalid Mahmud Arif (veteran of 1965 and 1971 war)  and the Chairman of the Joint Chiefs of Staff Admiral Muhammad Shariff (who was made POW by India during the Bangladesh Liberation War in 1971) to lead a specialized civil-military team to formulate a geo-strategy to counter the Soviet aggression. At this meeting, the Director-General of the ISI at that time, Lieutenant-General Akhtar Abdur Rahman advocated for an idea of covert operation in Afghanistan by arming the Islamic extremist, and was loudly heard saying: "Kabul must burn! Kabul must burn!".  As for Pakistan, the Soviet war with Islamist mujaheddin was a complete revenge in retaliation for the Soviet Union's long support of regional rival, India, notably during the 1971 war, which led the loss of East Pakistan.

In 1980, the relationship took a dangerous turn, when Soviet press, notable "Pravda" and other Soviet commentators, began to issue threatening statements towards Pakistan. Soviet Commentator, V Baikov, went far enough to say: The axis of United States and China, is trying to secure a base for its rapid deployment force, presumable offering F-16 fighter plans in that view."  Another Soviet commentator "threateningly" asked Pakistan that "If she (Pakistan) thought about where the United States was pulling it in its hostilities with Afghanistan; their aggression was taking place in the vicinity of the USSR". In February 1980, a delegation of TASS in New York City maintains that, "One can see the contours of dangerous plans aimed at Pakistan's arch rivals— India, Soviet Union, and Afghanistan.  The change of administration in 1980 and immediate verbal threat of Soviet Union to Pakistan, brought the United States and Pakistan on a six-year trade, economic and military agreement, valuing approximately ~32.5 billions US dollars.

The U.S. viewed the conflict in Afghanistan as an integral Cold War struggle, and the CIA provided assistance to anti-Soviet forces through the ISI, in a program called Operation Cyclone. The siphoning off of aid weapons, in which the weapons logistics and coordination were put under the Pakistan Navy in the port city of Karachi, contributed to disorder and violence there, while heroin entering from Afghanistan to pay for arms contributed to addiction problems. The Pakistan Navy coordinated the foreign weapons into Afghanistan, while some of its high-ranking admirals were responsible for storing the weapons in the Navy logistics depot, later coordinated the weapons supply to Mujaheddin, out of complete revenge of Pakistan Navy's brutal loss and defeat at the hands of the Soviet backed Indian Navy in 1971.

In November 1982, General Zia attended the funeral, in Moscow, of Leonid Brezhnev, the late General Secretary of the Communist Party of the Soviet Union. Soviet Foreign Minister Andrei Gromyko and new Secretary General Yuri Andropov met with Zia there. Andropov expressed indignation over Pakistan's covert support of the Afghan resistance against the Soviet Union and its satellite state, Communist Afghanistan. Zia took his hand and assured him, "General Secretary, believe me, Pakistan wants nothing but very good relations with the Soviet Union". According to Gromyko, Zia's sincerity convinced them, but Zia's actions didn't live up to his words. Ironically, Zia directly dealt with the Israel, working to build covert relations with Israel, allowing the country to actively participate in Soviet–Afghan War. Helped by ISI, the Mossad channeled Soviet reversed engineered weapons to Afghanistan. In Charlie Wilson's own word, Zia reported to have remarked to Israeli intelligence service: "Just don't put any stars of David on the boxes".

Democratic governments (1989–1991)

Prime Minister Benazir Bhutto (daughter of Zulfikar Ali Bhutto) authorized further aggressive military operations in Afghanistan to topple the fragile communist regime and to end the Soviet influence. One of her military authorizations was a military action in Jalalabad of Afghanistan in retaliation for the Soviet Union's long unconditional support of India, a proxy war in Pakistan, and Pakistan's loss in 1971 war. This operation was "a defining moment for her [Benazir's] government" to prove the loyalty to Pakistan Armed Forces. This operation planned by then-Director General of the Inter-Services Intelligence (ISI) Lieutenant-General Hamid Gul, with inclusion of U.S. ambassador to Pakistan  Robert Oakley. Known as Battle of Jalalabad, it was intended to gain a conventional victory on Soviet Union after Soviet Union had withdrawn its troops. But the operation failed miserably and the Afghan army supported by Soviet scuds won the battle resulting in ISI chief being sacked by the Prime Minister

At the end of years of Cold War, Soviet Union announced to establish a 1 GW commercial nuclear power plant in Pakistan, but after witnessing its aging technology Prime Minister Benazir Bhutto, later followed by Prime Minister Nawaz Sharif, did not authorize the purchase and showed little interest in aging Soviet technology.

In 1992, Prime Minister Nawaz Sharif released the details and company of Soviet soldiers to the Russian government when Alexander Rutskoy visited the country, after meeting in a committee led by Deputy Foreign Minister of Pakistan, Shahryar Khan.

Relations with the Russian Federation: 1991-present

After the Soviet Union troop withdrawal withdrawing the combatant troops from Communist Afghanistan, relations began to normalize with Pakistan. In the wake of fall of communism, Russian-Pakistan relations were warmed rapidly. In 1989, Soviet ambassador to Pakistan offered Pakistan to install a commercial nuclear power plant in the country, however after U.S. intervention, the plans were sent into cold storage. In 1994–95, Benazir Bhutto attempted to warm relations with Russia but suffered a major setback when Benazir Bhutto's government recognized Taliban-controlled government in Afghanistan as legitimate entity. In 1996, Russia willingly agreed to launch Pakistan's second satellite, Badr-B, from its Baikonur Cosmodrome for the lowest possible charges.

In 1997, Prime Minister Nawaz Sharif attempted to warm relations with Russia after sending farewell messages to Russian Federation. In 1998, although Russia congratulated India for conducting second nuclear tests, (see Pokhran-II), Russia did not immediately criticize Pakistan for performing its nuclear tests (see Chagai-I and Chagai-II) by the weekend of May 1998. In April 1999, Prime Minister Nawaz Sharif paid an important state visit to Kremlin, this was the first trip to Moscow paid by a Pakistani Prime Minister in 25 years, but no breakthrough was made. In 1999, Russia welcomed Pakistan and India for making a breakthrough in their relations with the Lahore Declaration but vehemently criticized Pakistan for holding it responsible for the outbreak of Indo-Pakistani War of 1999. Meanwhile, Russia played a major role in ending the war but remained hostile towards Pakistan.

Russia condemned the 1999 Pakistani coup d'état against Nawaz Sharif that removed him from power. On 19 April 2001, the Russian Deputy Minister of Foreign Affairs Alexander Losyukov paid a state visit to Pakistan, and both countries agreed to co-operate in economic development and to work towards peace and prosperity in the region. In the wake of September 11, 2001 attacks, the relations were warmed rapidly when Pakistan denounced the Taliban and joined the NATO coalition to hunt down jihadist organizations and al-Qaeda. The decision of Pakistan to join the international struggle against terrorism has led to Russia-Pakistan relations being greatly improved. Russia also played an integral role to ease off the nuclear 2001 Indo-Pakistan tensions.

In November 2016, Pakistan also decided to grant Russia access to the Gwadar Port, a warm water sea port as has done to both Iran and Turkmenistan.

Improvement in relations

Russia vowed its support for Pakistan in its struggle against the Taliban militants. In 2007, the relations between Pakistan and the Russian Federation were reactivated after the 3-day official visit of Russian Prime Minister Mikhail Fradkov. He was the first Russian Prime Minister to visit Pakistan in the post Soviet-era in 38 years. He had "in-depth discussions" with President Pervez Musharraf and Prime Minister Shaukat Aziz.

The major focus of the visit was to improve bilateral relations with particular emphasis on ways and means to enhance economic cooperation between the two countries. Under the Presidency of Asif Ali Zardari and Prime Minister Yousef Raza Gilani, relations between Pakistan and Russia improved significantly. In 2010, Prime Minister Vladimir Putin of Russia stated that Russia was against developing strategic and military ties with Pakistan because of Russian desire to place emphasis on strategic ties with India.

In 2011, Russia changed its policy and Putin publicly endorsed Pakistans bid to join the Shanghai Cooperation Organization and said that Pakistan was a very important partner in South Asia and the Muslim world for Russia. Putin offered Russia's assistance in expansion of Pakistan Steel Mills and provision of technical support for the Guddu and Muzaffargarh power plants and Russia was interested in developing the Thar Coal Project In 2011, Russia strongly condemned the NATO strike in Pakistan and the Russian foreign minister stated it is unacceptable to violate the sovereignty of a state, even when planning and carrying out counter-insurgent operations. In 2012, Russian president Vladimir Putin announced to pay a state visit to Pakistan soon after his re-election, later he cancelled it, citing other crucial engagement. To offset the diplomatic setback caused by this unexpected cancellation of much-anticipated visit, Putin's sent his Foreign Minister Sergey Lavrov.

Meanwhile, Pakistan army chief general Ashfaq Parvez Kayani visited Moscow from October 4 for three-day official visit. Where he was received warmly by Defence Minister Anatoly Serdyukov and Russian Ground Forces Commander-in-Chief (C-in-C) Colonel General Vladimir Chirkin.

On 5-August-2013 Colonel General Vladimir Chirkin visited Pakistan where he was received by General Ashfaq Parvez Kayani. The two generals discussed matters of mutual interest with emphasis on improving defence cooperation, army-to-army relations the security situation in the region, especially in Afghanistan post 2014.

In a press conference, the ambassador of Russia has agreed to sell helicopters to Pakistan to assist the country with terrorism and security related issues. Russia was still holding talks with Pakistan on the supply of the combat helicopters, and had lifted its embargo on the arms supply to Pakistan. "Such a decision has been taken. We are holding talks on supplying the helicopters," head of state-owned Rostec, Sergei Chemezov said, adding that the negotiations were about Russian Mi-35 Hind attack helicopters. Russia has long been the largest supplier of arms to India, which is the world's top arms buyer. But Moscow's move to supply Islamabad came as New Delhi is seeking to modernise its armed forces' ageing hardware and has recently chosen to buy arms from Israel, France, Britain and the United States.

Pakistan and Russia wrapped up their first strategic dialogue on 31-August-2013. At the talks held at the foreign secretaries' level in Moscow, the Pakistani side was led by Foreign Secretary Jalil Abbas Jilani and Russia's First Deputy Minister of Foreign Affairs Vladimir Georgiyevich Titov led his side. Russian Deputy Foreign Minister Igor Morgulov also participated in the consultations. The dialogue, the Foreign Office says, lays an institutional framework for building closer relations between the two countries through discussions for cooperation in political, economic, defence and other sectors. The two sides exchanged views on regional and international developments. Broadly, Pakistan and Russia agreed for more high-level contacts, closely coordinating positions on regional and international issues, and expanding trade and investment relations and cooperation in the field of energy and power generation. In July 2015 The COAS General Raheel Sharif paid a visit to Russia where he was received by the military leadership of Russia at Kremlin. This was the 1st visit of An COAS to Russia. He was given a Guard of Honour and while laying  wreath at the Tomb of Unknown Soldier the National Anthem of Pakistan was played. This was seen as an improvement in ties as Russia's longtime ally India moved towards US. Pakistan, Russia signs a landmark defence deal in 2015. This deal includes sale of four Mi-35 ‘Hind E’ attack helicopters to Pakistan. Russia is also interested in joining CPEC, which will benefit CPEC and strengthen Pakistan's economy. Another deal in 2015 includes Russia to invest $2bn in project of constructing north–south gas pipeline, first phase of which is expected to conclude by Dec 2017.

Economic and geopolitical convergence

In 1990, Benazir Bhutto of Pakistan sent a fare well message to Moscow in an attempt to set up the economic coordination between the two countries. In 1991, Benazir Bhutto headed a high-level economic delegation to Central Asia and Russia after the collapse of Soviet Union.

In 2003, the bilateral trade between Russia and Pakistan reached to 92 million US dollar, which increased to 411.4 million in 2006. The bilateral trade between each country reached to 630 million in 2008 and ~400 million in 2009. During this following year, both countries established the "Russian–Pakistan Intergovernmental Commission on Trade and Economic, Scientific and Technical Cooperation to cooperation in science and technology and education.

In 2011, Prime Minister Yousaf Raza Gillani and Vladimir Putin held a frank discussion in a cordial atmosphere on the 10th Heads of Government meeting of the Shanghai Cooperation Organisation. Russia is currently financing the mega-energy project, CASA-1000, transmitting power generation from Turkmenistan, Tajikistan, and Kyrgyzstan to Pakistan; Russia has provided 500Mn US dollars for the CASA-1000 power transmission project. In 2011, both countries initiated the work on the framework n the proposed Free Trade Agreement and currency swap arrangement to boost bilateral trade and further strengthen their economic ties.

In 2012, Russia and Pakistan have covertly developed geopolitical and strategic relations behind the scenes of world politics for the last two years, as Stephen Blank of Strategic Studies Institute maintained. As the NATO-led ISAF and the US Forces, Afghanistan Command, is planning to depart Afghanistan in 2014, the Russian Federation came to a conclusion that Pakistan is a crucial player in Afghanistan and that, as NATO withdraws, it becomes all the more urgent for Moscow to seek some sort of modus vivendi with Islamabad.

In November 2019, Pakistan decided to solve a Soviet-era trade dispute with Russia, in which the Pakistani government should pay $93.5 million to Russia within 90 days. The settlement would pave the way for Russia to invest over $8 billion in Pakistan.

The Special Representative of Pakistan for Afghanistan, Mohammad Sadiq, noted after visit in Moscow on September 9, 2022, that both sides share similar views on the situation in Afghanistan and plan to continue consultations on this issue in the future.

Cooperation in the field of energy
Cooperation in the field of energy between Pakistan and Russia occupies an important place in bilateral relations, since the Russian Federation is an advanced power in the field of oil and gas production, and Pakistan, in turn, is a developing country with huge energy needs. 

In October 2015, the partners signed an Intergovernmental Agreement on the construction of the North-South gas pipeline from Karachi to Lahore. In addition, an Intergovernmental Agreement on Cooperation in the field of Liquefied Natural Gas (LNG) was signed on October 13, 2017. In September 2018, the countries signed a Memorandum of Understanding to conduct a feasibility study for the construction of an offshore gas pipeline, and as a follow-up, on February 6, 2019, Russian Gazprom and the Pakistani company Inter State Gas Company Limited signed a Memorandum of Understanding regarding a feasibility study of gas supplies from the Middle East to South Asia.

In January 2022, Imran Khan strongly supports Pakistan Stream gas pipeline and imports of discounted Russian oil and wheat.

In December 2022, Minister of State for Petroleum Musadik Malik says the Pakistani government has held fruitful talks with Russia for import of cheap oil, diesel and gas.

Military cooperation
Military-technical cooperation between Russia and Pakistan is under development. The Russian Federation had to establish relations with Pakistan, which were severed at the initiative of the USSR back in the 1980s. In 1996, Russia for the first time signed an agreement on the supply of multi-purpose Mi-17 helicopters to Pakistan. During the period from 1996 to 2004, the Russian Federation supplied about 70 helicopters to the partner.

Increasing military cooperation between Islamabad and Moscow would not negatively impact Russia's ties with India, Deputy Foreign Minister Sergey Ryabkov said in 2015, adding that Pak-Russia ties were improving in other sectors as well—including energy. The two countries signed a defense cooperation agreement in 2014. As of early 2021, Moscow has supplied the Pakistan with a batch of Mi-35 attack helicopters and it has signed contracts with the Asian nation to deliver anti-tank systems, air defense weapons and small arms. In addition, Islamabad intended to purchase another 10-12 units of such helicopters, and also showed interest in purchasing multi-purpose Su-35 fighters with a longer range than light Chinese JF-17s, which are in service with the Pakistani Air Force along with American F-16s. Back in 2018, the telegram channel "Militarist" reported that Pakistan had finalized a contract for the purchase of 54 SU-35 fighters, however, this information was not confirmed.

On August 7, 2018, during the visit to Pakistan of the Deputy Minister of Defense of the Russian Federation Alexander Fomin, a contract was signed between Moscow and Islamabad, providing Pakistani servicemen with the opportunity to study at universities of the Ministry of Defense of the Russian Federation. The agreement was signed following the results of the first meeting of the Russian-Pakistani Joint Military Advisory Committee (JMCC). Before signing this document, officers of the Pakistani army were trained in the United States.

Russian Army War Games 2015
Pakistan Army actively participated in Russian Army War Games 2015 held in Russian Far east. Pakistan was also among the six countries that took part in Master of The Air Defense Battle Competition in August 2015 besides Russia, China, Egypt, Venezuela and Belarus.

"Friendship" ("Druzhba") exercises

The first annual joint exercise between the Russian military and the Pakistan Army took place under the name "Friendship 2016". 70 Russians and 130 Pakistanis took part in the exercise, held from 24 September to 10 October 2016, in Cherat, in Pakistan's north-western Khyber Pakhtunkhwa Province. India had unsuccessfully asked Russia to call off the exercise as a gesture of "solidarity" following the 18 September 2016 militant attack on an Indian Army base, which the government of India had blamed on the government of Pakistan.

From November 8 to 21, 2020, the 5th joint Russian-Pakistani Druzhba 2020 exercise was held. More than 150 servicemen of the armies of the two countries took part in the exercises. From the Armed Forces of the Russian Federation, more than 70 military personnel of special purpose units of the 49th Combined Arms Army of the Southern Military District were involved in the exercise.

October 2021 — joint Russian-Pakistani exercise "Friendship-2021", at the Molkino training ground in the Krasnodar Territory. The main task of the exercises was to improve the ways of interaction when performing a wide range of tasks. Special attention was paid to the development of fighting skills in urban conditions and the use of a "consolidated assault company" in the liberation of settlements and objects captured by terrorists.

From February 15 to 16, 2021, a detachment of ships of the Russian Navy, at the invitation of the Pakistani side, took part in the maritime phase of the multinational naval exercises "Aman-2021".

During Russo-Ukrainian war 
Pakistani Prime Minister Imran Khan visited Russia from February 23–24, 2022. It was the first visit of any Pakistani ruler to Russia since 1999.

Pakistan ‘abstains’ from voting as UN General Assembly censures Russia in March 2022, and ‘remains neutral’.

According to Indian media reports, Pakistan has provided weapons to Ukraine in spite of Russian protests, a claim denied by Pakistan's foreign ministry.

Dialogue at the SCO-2022 summit in Samarkand
Against the background of catastrophic floods in Pakistan in 2022 and possible food shortages, Russia, in addition to gas supplies, offered to supply wheat to Pakistan.  In addition, on the sidelines of the SCO summit, at a meeting with Shehbaz Sharif, Russian President Vladimir Putin mentioned that pipeline gas supplies to Pakistan are possible and part of the infrastructure has already been created. In addition, according to the statements of the Minister of Defense of Pakistan, Russian President Vladimir Putin highly appreciated Pakistan's position on the Russian-Ukrainian war at the UN and at the international level.

Post-flood relief in 2022 
After the devastating floods in 2022, Russia provided assistance to Pakistan. Food, tents and water purification devices were handed over.

Public opinion
Due to rapidly shifting global geopolitical interests spurred by the end of the Cold War and the ongoing U.S.-led War on Terror, Pakistani public opinion towards Russia has fluctuated in recent years, with 18% viewing Russia favorably in 2007, falling to 11% in 2011 and rising to 20% in 2012, and according to the BBC World Service Poll, 9% of Pakistanis view Russian influence positively in 2010, 14% in 2011, falling to 12% in 2012, and increasing to 18% in 2013.

However, Pakistanis have generally rated Vladimir Putin's leadership poorly, with 7% expressing confidence in him in 2006, and only 3% in 2012, and for the most part, a plurality of Russians have consistently rated Pakistan's influence negatively, with 13% expressing a positive view in 2008, increasing slightly to 14% in 2010, and falling to 8% in 2013.

Diplomatic missions 
Russia maintains an embassy in the capital of Pakistan, Islamabad, and Pakistan has an embassy in Moscow in Russia.

Pakistani Embassy 
The Pakistani embassy is located in Moscow.

 Ambassador Shafqat Ali Khan

Russian Embassy 
The Russian embassy is located in Islamabad.

 Ambassador Danila Ganich

Cultural exchanges

The world's first bilingual Urdu-Russian dictionary was compiled and launched by Uzbek scholar Dr. Tashmirza Khalmirzaev in 2012 at a ceremony in Islamabad. Khalmirzaev said the dictionary aimed to "help speakers of both languages come closer." He also added that a new era was dawning in Pakistan's relationship with Russia and other Central Asian states and encouraged the government of Pakistan to continue work in promoting Urdu in Russia and Central Asia.

Ideologies
On 13 January 2013, a poll in seven countries was managed by the Washington Post, to see whether the people of those seven countries prefer democratic government or one with a "strong" leader. Most Russian and Pakistanis voted that "they prefer a "strong ruler" over democracy."

Literature and art

A Pakistani Urdu poet Faiz Ahmad Faiz was awarded the Lenin Peace Prize, a Soviet equivalent of Nobel Peace Prize.

Media gallery

See also
 Kharotabad Incident when four Russian nationals were shot dead by members of the paramilitary Frontier Corps. It occurred in the Pakistani province of Balochistan.
 Akhlas Akhlaq, a Russian citizen born to a Pakistani father and who was arrested and executed in Pakistan on terrorism charges under mysterious circumstances and unproven allegations.
 List of ambassadors of Russia to Pakistan

References

Further reading
 Azad, Tahir.  “Pakistan-Russia Strategic Partnership: New Horizons for Cooperation,” Institute of Strategic Studies Islamabad, Issue Brief, December 26, 2016, online
 Choudhury, G.W. India, Pakistan, Bangladesh, and the Major Powers: Politics of a Divided Subcontinent (1975), relations with US, USSR and China.
 Khan, Muhammad Taimur Fahad. "Pakistan’s Foreign Policy towards Russia." Strategic Studies 39.3 (2019): 89–104. online
 Khan, Taimur. “Pakistan’s Growing Relations with Russia: Factoring in the Role of the US,” Strategic Studies 38, no. 2 (Summer 2018), online

External links

  Documents on the Pakistan–Russia relationship at the Russian Ministry of Foreign Affairs
 https://www.businessinsider.com/32-year-anniversary-of-first-stinger-missile-use-in-afghanistan-2018-9
 https://2001-2009.state.gov/r/pa/ho/time/qfp/104481.htm

 
Bilateral relations of Russia
Russia